Quebec County was a federal electoral district in Quebec, Canada, that was represented in the House of Commons of Canada from 1867 to 1925.

It was created by The British North America Act, 1867 which preserved existing ridings in Lower Canada.  It was abolished in 1924 when it was merged into Québec—Montmorency riding.

Members of Parliament

This riding elected the following Members of Parliament:

Election results

By-election: On Mr. Chauveau being called to the Senate, 20 February 1873

By-election: On Mr. Caron being appointed Minister of Militia and Defence, 8 November 1880

By-election: On Mr. Fitzpatrick being appointed Solicitor General, 11 July 1896

By-election: On Mr. Fitzpatrick being appointed Chief Justice of Canada, 4 June 1906

By-election: On Mr. Pelletier being appointed Postmaster General, 10 October 1911

By-election: On Mr. Pelletier's resignation, 20 October 1914

See also 

 List of Canadian federal electoral districts
 Past Canadian electoral districts

External links 
 Riding history from the Library of Parliament

Former federal electoral districts of Quebec